Timon Janis Wellenreuther (born 3 December 1995) is a German professional footballer who plays as a goalkeeper for Feyenoord, on loan from Anderlecht.

Club career

Schalke 04

Born in Karlsruhe, Germany, Wellenreuther played for various youth teams, starting with SC Bulach, SVK Beiertheim, SpVgg Durlach-Aue, Astoria Walldorf and Karlsruher SC. It was announced in March 2013 that Wellenreuther joined Schalke 04 in 2013 from Karlsruher SC.

After officially joining Schalke 04, Wellenreuther was assigned to Schalke 04 II in July 2013 Wellenreuther made his Schalke 04 II debut in the opening game of the season, where he kept a clean sheet, in a 5–0 win over VfL Theesen U19. However, he struggled throughout the season, making eleven appearances, as he faced the season with injuries, and suspension. Nevertheless, he signed his first professional contract with the club, keeping him until 2017.

In the 2014–15 season, Wellenreuther began to established himself as a first team choice goalkeeper for Schalke 04 II and played sixteen matches in the first half of that season. In the first team, he received a number forty shirt for the new season. In January 2015, Wellenreuther was promoted to the first team after being called up by the first team for the training camp in Qatar. He made his Bundesliga debut on 3 February 2015 against Bayern Munich in a 1–1 away draw. He replaced Fabian Giefer at half-time. Three days later, on 6 February 2015, he made his first Bundesliga start, keeping a clean sheet, in a 3–0 win over Borussia Mönchengladbach. He started the Champions League Round of 16 first leg match against Real Madrid on 18 February 2015 and played in the next leg at Santiago Bernabéu Stadium, in a 4–3 win but was eliminated from the tournament following a 5–4 defeat on aggregate. Wellenreuther had a handful of first team appearances throughout February and March until he lost his first place in favor of Ralf Fährmann, who returned from injury, for the rest of the season and went on to make eight appearances in all competitions.

After his loan spell at RCD Mallorca came to an end, Wellenreuther remained out of the first team for the most of the 2016–17 season and was demoted to the reserve side, where he made nine appearances. At the end of the 2016–17 season, he was released by the club.

Mallorca (loan)

On 25 June 2015, Wellenreuther moved abroad for the first time when he joined Segunda División side Mallorca on a season-long loan to gain some first team experience.

Wellenreuther made his Mallorca debut in the opening game of the season, starting the whole game, in a 2–0 loss against Alcorcón. In the follow up match against Ponferradina on 30 August 2015, he kept a clean sheet throughout the match, in a 1–0 win, their first win of the season. Since making his Mallorca debut, Wellenreuther began to established himself as a first choice goalkeeper in the first team. However, he served a three match suspension during a 3–2 loss against Athletic Bilbao B on 7 February 2016 after being involved in an incident following the end of the match. Despite this, he went on to make thirty-three appearances for Mallorca in all competitions.

Willem II
Wellenreuther signed a two-year contract at Dutch football club Willem II on 23 May 2017. On 28 February 2019, he helped the club reach the Dutch cup final by stopping 3 out of 5 penalties.

Anderlecht
On 5 June 2020, he moved to Anderlecht in Belgium on a four-year contract. After beginning the 2020–21 season as a back-up to club captain Hendrik Van Crombrugge, he became the starting goalkeeper in November 2020 after Van Crombrugge's back injury required surgery and remained a starter until the end of the season. By the beginning of the 2021–22 season, Van Crombrugge recovered and reclaimed his starting position, pushing Wellenreuther back to the bench.

Willem II (loan)
On 18 August 2021, he returned to Willem II on loan.

Feyenoord (loan)
On 16 August 2022, Anderlecht announced that Wellenreuther would be loaned to Eredivisie club Feyenoord for the 2022-23 season.

International career
In April 2015, Wellenreuther was called by Germany U20 for the first time. He made his Germany U20 debut, playing 45 minutes, in a 2–1 loss against Italy U20. He was featured for the FIFA U-20 World Cup but appeared as an unused substitute throughout the tournament.

In August 2015, Wellenreuther was called up by Germany U21 for the first time. He made his Germany U21 debut on 3 September 2015, starting the whole game, in a 2–1 win over Denmark U21. However, the following year, Wellenreuther was expected to be included in the Germany U23 squad to follow Leon Goretzka and Max Meyer but was dropped from the squad after Schalke 04 did not give the DFB the clearance to allow him to join the squad for the Summer Olympics.

Personal life
His father, Ingo Wellenreuther, is a politician and the current chairman of Karlsruher SC.

Wellenreuther revealed he started out as a goalkeeper while at Bulacher SC and from that moment on, he played as a goalkeeper. He also excelled in tennis, golf and swimming. He attended the Gesamtschule Berger Feld until 2014.

Career statistics

References

External links
 
 

1995 births
Living people
Footballers from Karlsruhe
German footballers
Association football goalkeepers
Bundesliga players
Segunda División players
Eredivisie players
Belgian Pro League players
FC Schalke 04 players
FC Schalke 04 II players
RCD Mallorca players
Willem II (football club) players
R.S.C. Anderlecht players
Feyenoord players
German expatriate footballers
Expatriate footballers in Spain
German expatriate sportspeople in Spain
Expatriate footballers in the Netherlands
German expatriate sportspeople in the Netherlands
Expatriate footballers in Belgium
German expatriate sportspeople in Belgium
Germany youth international footballers
Germany under-21 international footballers
FC Astoria Walldorf players
People educated at the Gesamtschule Berger Feld